Lucien Aguettand (28 January 1901 – 14 February 1989) was a French art director who designed the sets for over eighty films during his career.

Selected filmography
 Little Devil May Care (1928)
 All That's Not Worth Love (1931)
 The Wonderful Day (1932)
 The Lady of Lebanon (1934)
 Koenigsmark (1935)
 The Secrets of the Red Sea (1937)
 White Cargo (1937)
 Behind the Facade (1939)
 Bolero (1942)
 At Your Command, Madame (1942)
 I Am with You (1943)
 First on the Rope (1944)
 The Lost Village (1947)
 The Murdered Model (1948)
 Brilliant Waltz (1949)
 Scandal on the Champs-Élysées (1949)
 Quay of Grenelle (1950)
 The Secret of Helene Marimon (1954)
 House on the Waterfront (1955)

References

Bibliography
 Hayward, Susan. French Costume Drama of the 1950s: Fashioning Politics in Film. Intellect Books, 2010.

External links

1901 births
1989 deaths
French art directors
Film people from Paris